Henri Lehmann (14 April 1814 – 30 March 1882) was a German-born French historical painter and portraitist.

Life
Born Heinrich Salem Lehmann in Kiel, in the Duchy of Holstein, he received his first art tuition from his father Leo Lehmann (1782–1859) and from other painters in Hamburg. In 1831, at the age of 17, he travelled to Paris to study art under Jean Auguste Dominique Ingres, becoming one of his most accomplished pupils and a close associate for many years. His first exhibition was at the Salon in 1835 where he won a second-class medal. Thereafter he exhibited regularly at the Salon, winning first-class medals in 1840, 1848 and 1855.
 
Lehmann lived in Rome from 1838–41, where he continued his artistic education with Ingres (who was by then Director of the Académie de France there), and collaborated with him on some works—including Ingres' painting Luigi Cherubini and the Muse of Lyric Poetry. In Rome Lehmann befriended Franz Liszt and his lover, the author Marie d'Agoult, corresponding with them for many years and painting portraits of them.

Lehmann settled permanently in Paris in 1842. He was awarded many commissions for large-scale public works, such as at the Hôtel de Ville, the Church of Ste-Clothilde, the Palais du Luxembourg, the Palais de Justice, and the Chapel of the Jeunes Aveugles in the Church of Saint-Merri on Rue Saint-Martin.

In 1846 Lehmann received the Légion d'honneur and in 1847 became a French citizen, opening his studio in that same year. In 1861 he became a teacher at the famous École des Beaux-Arts and was appointed Professor in 1875. He founded the Lehmann Prize to recognise academic excellence in art. In 1864 he was elected a member of the Institut de France.

He died in Paris in 1882. His brother Rudolf Lehmann was also a well-known portrait artist.

Pupils of Lehmann
Edmond Aman-Jean
Édouard Joseph Dantan
Julien Dupré
Amédée Forestier
Alphonse Osbert
Camille Pissarro
Alexandre Séon
Georges Seurat
Modesto Brocos

Work

Lehmann was a painter of portraits, religious, genre, historical, allegorical and literary works. He drew inspiration from classical mythology, Shakespeare, Goethe, and contemporary writers. Sometimes considered dry and academic, the best of his work can be both pure in line and graceful in form. Among the best of his canvases are:

Jephtha's Daughter (1836)
Grief of the Oceanides (1850)
Prometheus
Erigone's Dream
Venus Anadyomene
Adoration of Magi and Shepherds (1855, Rheims Museum)
Marriage of Tobias (1866)

Mural paintings include those in the chapels of the church of St. Merry, on the ceiling of the Great Hall in the Palais de Justice, and in the Throne Hall, Luxembourg Palace.

He painted numerous portraits of celebrated contemporaries, including Edmond About, Marie d'Agoult, Princess Christina Belgiojoso, Chopin, Victor Cousin, Charles Gounod, Ingres, Liszt, and Stendhal. He painted a portrait of himself for the Uffizi Gallery, Florence.

References

Sources
Boulanger, Gustave, Notice sur M. Lehmann, speech memorializing Lehmann, with many biographical and personal details, delivered before the Académie des Beaux-Arts, session of 27 January 1883.
Jouin, Henri Auguste. Maîtres contemporains, Paris: Perrin et cie, 1887; chapter 6, p. 150 ff.
Lehmann, Rudolf, An Artist's Reminiscences, London: Smith, Elder & Co., 1894.
Turner, Jane (Ed.). The Grove Dictionary of Art: From Monet to Cézanne: Late 19th-Century French Artists, St. Martin's Press, 2000; pp. 270–271.

External links and references

Works by Lehmann (ArtCyclopedia)

1814 births
1882 deaths
Lehmann family
Artists from Kiel
People from the Duchy of Holstein
19th-century French painters
French male painters
French muralists
French people of German descent
Members of the Académie des beaux-arts
German emigrants to France
Recipients of the Legion of Honour